Caroline Ferguson Gordon (October 6, 1895 – April 11, 1981) was an American novelist and literary critic who, while still in her thirties, received a Guggenheim Fellowship in 1932 and an O. Henry Award in 1934.

Biography 
Gordon was born and raised in Todd County, Kentucky at her family's plantation home, "Woodstock".  She was educated at her father's Clarksville Classical School for Boys in Montgomery County, Tennessee. In 1916, Gordon graduated from Bethany College and became a writer of society news for the Chattanooga Reporter newspaper in Chattanooga, Tennessee.

In the summer of 1924, Gordon returned home to Kentucky, when she met the poet Allen Tate. She moved with Tate to New York City, where they first lived together in Greenwich Village.  They later shared a house with Hart Crane in Patterson, New York.  Tate and Gordon wed in New York City on May 15, 1925, and their daughter Nancy was born in September 1925.  In 1928, the family traveled to Europe, where they spent the next two years.

After returning from Europe in 1930, Gordon and her family moved to BenFolly, a house they purchased in Clarksville, Tennessee, with the assistance of Tate's brother Ben.  Gordon and Tate entertained literary notables such as Robert Lowell, who camped on their lawn one summer. Other visitors included F. Scott Fitzgerald, Ernest Hemingway, William Faulkner, Flannery O'Connor, T. S. Eliot, Robert Penn Warren, and Ford Madox Ford.  Ford served as a mentor to Gordon, counseling her on her literary work and prodding her into completing her first novel Penhally, published in 1931. Gordon received  the Guggenheim and the O. Henry during this early period. The O. Henry was a unique second-place prize awarded for her 1934 short story "Old Red", published in Scribner's Magazine. Gordon's early fiction was influenced by her association with the Southern Agrarians. Paul V. Murphy writes that she "exhibited a southern nostalgia as strong as any member of the group, including Davidson, the most unreconstructed of the Agrarians". Between 1934 and 1972, Gordon published nine additional novels, five written during the late 1930s and World War II.

Tate and Gordon moved to Monteagle, Tennessee, in 1942.  At some point in the 1940s, they moved to Princeton, New Jersey, to a house they named BenBrackets. In 1945, Gordon and Tate divorced, but they remarried in 1946 and moved back to New York City.

Gordon became a friend and mentor to novelists Walker Percy and Flannery O'Connor.  Gordon also became a close friend of author Brainard Cheney and his wife, Frances (Fanny) Neel Cheney. Brainard Cheney considered Gordon to be his "literary mentor." According to Cheney, she taught him to write literature as compared to his previous occupation as a crime reporter. On November 24, 1947, Gordon converted to Catholicism.  Influenced by Gordon, the Cheneys also converted to Catholicism. Gordon introduced the couple to Flannery O'Connor, with whom they became close friends.

Gordon divorced Tate in 1959 on grounds of desertion. Tate remarried four days later, but he and Gordon remained correspondents and friends until Tate's death in 1979.

In her later years, Gordon moved to  San Cristóbal de las Casas in Chiapas, Mexico.  On  March 1, 1981, she suffered a stroke.  Gordon died six weeks later, following surgery, at age 85.

Selected works 
Penhally (1931) 
Aleck Maury, Sportsman (1934) 
None Shall Look Back (1937) 
The Garden of Adonis (1937)
Green Centuries (1941) 
The Women on the Porch (1944) 
The Forest of the South (1945) 
The House of Fiction: An Anthology of the Short Story (with Allen Tate) (1950) 
The Strange Children (1951) 
The Malefactors (1956) 
A Good Soldier: A Key to the Novels of Ford Madox Ford (1957) 
How to Read a Novel (1957) 
Old Red and Other Stories (1963) 
The Glory of Hera (1972) 
The Collected Stories of Caroline Gordon (1981)

References 

1895 births
1981 deaths
20th-century American novelists
American women novelists
People from Clarksville, Tennessee
People from Todd County, Kentucky
Novelists from Kentucky
Novelists from Tennessee
Writers of American Southern literature
Converts to Roman Catholicism
Bethany College (West Virginia) alumni
20th-century American women writers
Kentucky women writers
Southern Agrarians